The Danville Area School District is a midsized, rural, public school district which spans portions of two counties in Pennsylvania. In Montour County it covers the Boroughs of Danville and Washingtonville and Cooper Township, Derry Township, Liberty Township, Mahoning Township, Mayberry Township, Valley Township and West Hemlock Township. In Northumberland County it covers the Borough of Riverside and Rush Township. According to 2000 federal census data, it served a resident population of 18,894. By 2010, the district's population declined to 18,765 people. The educational attainment levels for the Danville Area School District population (25 years old and over) were 89.8% high school graduates and 27.4% college graduates. The district is one of the 500 public school districts of Pennsylvania.

According to the Pennsylvania Budget and Policy Center, 28.8% of the district's pupils lived at 185% or below the Federal Poverty level as shown by their eligibility for the federal free or reduced price school meal programs in 2012. In 2009, the residents' per capita income was $20,247, while the median family income was $46,435. In the Commonwealth, the median family income was $49,501 and the United States median family income was $49,445, in 2010. In Montour County, the median household income was $45,255. By 2013, the median household income in the United States rose to $52,100.

Danville Area School District officials report

The district operates Danville Area High School (Grades 9-12), Danville Middle School (Grades 6-8), Liberty Valley Intermediate Elementary School (Grades 3-5), and Danville Area Primary Elementary School (Grades K2). Of the 4 elementary schools formerly operated by the district until June 2011, only Liberty Valley remains open today. Danville Elementary School, Riverside Elementary School, and Mahoning Cooper Elementary School all closed in the 2011 consolidation of the new Danville Area Primary Elementary School.  The district provides an online learning option called Danville eLearning Cyber Academy.

Mascot and Colors
The district's school colors are Orange and Purple and its mascot is the Ironman.  The Orange and Purple represent the colors of hot iron.  Iron turns orange at forging temperatures and purple at even hotter casting temperatures.  This is due to the historical significance of an iron refinery in downtown Danville.  Danville Area was commissioned in 1900, within a few years of when the mill closed.  The refinery stood idle for decades, but it was finally demolished in the 1930s.

History
Shortly before the turn of the 20th century, the Commonwealth of Pennsylvania called for special districts acting as their own local government units to run the state's public school system, whereas counties, boroughs, townships, towns, and cities had previously been allowed to run schools. In 1900, the legislature commissioned Danville School District. Originally, the district covered only Danville, but it was granted an increasing geographical region as the state decommissioned surrounding districts. It expanded to cover all but the very northernmost townships of Montour County. Later, with the decommission and annexation of South Danville School District, it took up part of Northumberland County as well. In 1957, Danville School District was awarded the designation of "Area" in its name. In 2007, a U.S. News & World Report study rated Danville High School in the top 5% as one of the best public high schools in the United States of America. In 2010, the high school was no longer listed in the Top US Schools Listing.

Extracurriculars
The district offers a wide variety of clubs, activities and an extensive sports program. Danville Area School District is a member of the Pennsylvania Heartland Athletic Conference for all athletics and participates under the rules and guidelines of the Pennsylvania Interscholastic Athletic Association. The Pennsylvania Heartland Athletic Conference is a voluntary association of 25 PIAA High Schools within the central Pennsylvania region.

The high school is also well known for its Forensics Team, which competes in the National Forensics League, National Catholic Forensics League, and Pennsylvania High School Speech League.  Other high school groups include the student council (a member of the Pennsylvania Association of Student Councils), the Danville chapter of the Future Farmers of America, Students Against Destructive Decisions, the Spanish Club, Ski Club, the literary magazine, the Key Club, and yearbook club.

Sports
The district funds:

Boys
Baseball - AA
Basketball- AAA
Bowling - AAAA
Cross Country - Class AA
Football - AA
Golf -AA
Indoor Track and Field - AAAA
Lacrosse - AA
Soccer - AA
Swimming and Diving - Class AA
Tennis - AA
Track and Field - AA
Wrestling - AA

Girls
Basketball - AA
Bowling - AAAA
Cross Country - AA
Field Hockey - AA
Golf - AA
Indoor Track and Field - AAAA
Lacrosse (Spring) - AA 
Soccer (Fall) - AA
Softball - AAA
Swimming and Diving - AA
Girls' Tennis - AA
Track and Field

Middle School Sports

Boys
Basketball
Cross Country
Football
Soccer
Track and Field
Wrestling	

Girls
Basketball
Cross Country
Field Hockey
Track and Field

According to PIAA directory July 2012

References

External links
Central Susquehanna Intermediate Unit CSIU16
Columbia-Montour Area Vocational-Technical School
SusQCyber Charter School

School districts in Montour County, Pennsylvania
School districts in Northumberland County, Pennsylvania
School districts established in 1900
1900 establishments in Pennsylvania